{{DISPLAYTITLE:C11H16O2}} 
The molecular formula C11H16O2 (molar mass: 180.24354 g/mol, exact mass: 	180.11503 u) may refer to:

 Butylated hydroxyanisole
 Dihydroactinidiolide
 Jasmolone
 Olivetol, an alkylresorcinol found in lichens